The 35th Kisei began league play on 3 June 2010 and concluded with Cho U defending his title in six games over challenger Iyama Yuta on 11 March 2011.

Preliminary tournament
The preliminary tournament started on 17 December 2009. O Rissei, Cho U, Akiyama Jiro,  Yoda Norimoto, Hane Naoki, Kono Rin, Takao Shinji, and Iyama Yuta all maintained their place in the Kisei league from the 34th Kisei, while Kiyonari Tetsuya, Ri Ishu, Cho Chikun, and Miyazawa Goro were eliminated. These players were replaced by preliminary winners Ryu Shikun, Yamashiro Hiroshi, Kato Atsushi, and O Meien.

League play
League play commenced on 3 June 2010 after the preliminaries, which finished on 18 March 2010. Takao Shinji went undefeated to win League A, while Iyama Yuta finished tied on record with Yamashiro Hiroshi in League B. Because Yuta had beaten Hiroshi by resignation on 30 September, Yuta progressed to the challenger finals to face Shinji.

League A

League B

Challenger finals

Finals

References

2011 in go
Kisei (Go)
2010 in go